Calton Coffie (born ?) is a Jamaican vocalist who rose to prominence for his work in the Jamaican-based recording act Inner Circle, but had also recorded as a vocal soloist.

He was active in the reggae group from 1986 to 1994, when he began performing under the moniker Hot Cup of Coffie, based in the United Kingdom. For a brief period, his career was put on hold due to health problems. Coffie is perhaps best known for providing vocals for their smash hit single Sweat (A La La La La Long), which entered the European charts upon its release. His 4 decade long career proclaimed him 1 Grammy Award win and 2 nominations, for Sweat (A La La La La Long), Bad Boys and Reggae Dancer.

Little is known about Coffie, and his activity in the music business has faltered.

References

Jamaican reggae musicians
Living people
Year of birth missing (living people)